is a fashion subculture that emerged in Japan in the mid-2010s. Aiming to break societal gender norms in fashion, the genderless subculture is centered on gender non-conforming androgynous fashion.

Characteristics

The term "genderless" was coined by talent agent Takashi Marumoto to describe actor and model Toman, one of the influential figures of the genderless subculture. Men who are part of the subculture are idealized as "slim-bodied" and "cute-faced", using hair dye and makeup to accentuate their appearance, alongside flashy clothing and "cute" accessories.

The genderless subculture is seen as a rejection of traditional gender roles. Unlike in the West, the subculture is more associated with fashion than sexuality or gender identity, and is not considered to be a person attempting to "pass" as the opposite gender, or declaring themselves gay or transgender. Masafumi Monden, a researcher from the University of Technology Sydney, as well as several genderless men, have reasoned that this is because Japanese society puts a clear separation between appearance and sexuality. However, some men have stated that being part of the genderless subculture has made them more accepting of other sexualities.

History

Unisex fashion for men has also been expressed through anime and manga.

Modern genderless fashion originated in the Harajuku district of Tokyo. The earliest influence is JW Anderson's Fall 2013 collection, of which featured male models in feminine clothing during its showcase. By 2015, genderless fashion gained popularity in Japan. It and drew heavy influences from the androgynous styling of South Korean K-pop boy bands, visual kei, and fashion from the 1980s and 1990s in the United States. Influential figures for the genderless subculture are actor and model Toman; model and media personality Ryuchell; and media personality . One of the few notable figures for genderless women in media is actor and model Satsuki Nakayama; however, there are fewer genderless women in entertainment compared to genderless men. Junko Mitsuhashi, a professor of gender studies at Meiji University, has suggested that genderless fashion may have come about from young men who were "jealous of women because they can express themselves through fashion." Most fans of genderless men are young girls.

The first instance of the term "genderless men" appeared in 2015 to describe Toman. By 2016, genderless fashion had been popularized through social media websites such as Instagram and Tumblr. In 2017, En Coton, a tailoring company, opened an online service called Madam M, claiming to be the first clothing repair store for LGBT people in Tokyo, with options for "genderless" custom orders.

In media

Hugtto! PreCure (2018) gained media attention through an episode focusing Henri Wakamiya, a character with a genderless appearance; his episode arc also included the line, "Even boys can become princesses!" from protagonist Cure Yell, which led media to speculate he may become the first male Pretty Cure in the history of the franchise.

Notes

References

Further reading
 
 
 
 
 Leleu, Clémence (March, 2021). Jeunesse Dégenrée. Tempura Magazine, Printemps 2021 (in French).

Fashion aesthetics
History of fashion
21st-century fashion
Japanese fashion
Japanese subcultures
Androgyny
2010s in Japan